is a railway station on the Nagasaki Main Line in Isahaya, Nagasaki Prefecture, Japan. It is operated by JR Kyushu and is on the Nagasaki Main Line.

Lines

Station layout 
The station consists of a side and an island platform serving three tracks with a siding branching off track 1. The station building is a simple timber structure and is unstaffed, serving only as a waiting room with an automatic ticket vending machine. Access to the island platform is by means of a footbridge.

Adjacent stations

History
Japanese Government Railways (JGR) built the station in the 1930s during the development of an alternative route for the Nagasaki Main Line along the coast of the Ariake Sea. With through traffic achieved from Hizen-Yamaguchi on the new route to Nagasaki, the entire stretch of track was designated as part of the Nagasaki Main Line on 1 December 1934. With the privatization of Japanese National Railways (JNR), the successor of JGR, on 1 April 1987, control of the station passed to JR Kyushu.

Passenger statistics
In fiscal 2014, there were a total of 92,199 boarding passengers, given a daily average of 253 passengers.

Surrounding area
 Isahaya Municipal Takaki Junior High School
 Yue Elementary School
 Wadoji Temple

See also
 List of railway stations in Japan

References

External links
Yue Station (JR Kyushu)

Stations of Kyushu Railway Company
Nagasaki Main Line
Railway stations in Nagasaki Prefecture
Railway stations in Japan opened in 1934